Tiatia is a ‘suafa matai’ or chiefly title within the village of Tufu-Gataivai, Savai’i. The position of this chiefly title is a Tulafale-Ali’i, possessing both oratory and kingship status. Tiatia is also a rare Samoan surname, generally only found in the Samoan village of Gataivai. Notable people with the surname include:

  Fa’aolatane Faumuina Tiatia Liuga, former Minister of Finance and cabinet minister of the Government of Samoa
 Angela Tiatia (born 1973), New Zealand-Australian artist of Samoan heritage
 Chase Tiatia (born 1995), New Zealand-born Samoan rugby union player
 Filo Tiatia (born 1971), New Zealand international rugby union footballer
 Taumihau Tiatia (born 1991), Tahitian footballer